Polycrase or polycrase-(Y) is a black or brown metallic complex uranium yttrium oxide mineral with the chemical formula . It is amorphous. It has a Mohs hardness of 5 to 6 and a specific gravity of 5. It is radioactive due to its uranium content (around 6%). It occurs in granitic pegmatites.

Polycrase forms a continuous series with the niobium rich rare earth oxide euxenite.

It was first described in 1870 at Rasvag, Hidra (Hittero) Island, near Flekkefjord, Norway. It is found in Sweden, Norway, and the United States.

References

Mindat with location data
Webmineral

Uranium minerals
Thorium minerals
Calcium minerals
Cerium minerals
Yttrium minerals
Lanthanide minerals
Niobium minerals
Tantalum minerals
Titanium minerals
Oxide minerals
Amorphous solids
Orthorhombic minerals
Minerals in space group 60
Minerals described in 1870